Tuvia is a Hebrew male given name that may refer to

Tuvia Beeri (1929–2022), Czech-Israeli painter
Tuvia Bielski (1906–1987), Jewish partisan leader
Tuvia Friling (born 1953), Israeli historian
Tuvia Grossman, American-Israeli victim of Arab mob violence 
Tuvia Katz (born 1936), Israeli artist
Tuvia Sagiv (born 1947), Israeli architect
Tuvia Tenenbom (born 1957), Israel theater director, playwright, author, journalist and essayist 
Tuvia Tzafir (born 1945), Israeli actor and entertainer